Zed Key (born April 4, 2002) is an American college basketball player for the Ohio State Buckeyes of the Big Ten Conference.

Early life and high school career
Key was born on April 4, 2002 in Bay Shore, New York. He was raised in Bay Shore and went to high school at Long Island Lutheran High School in Brookville, New York. With teammate and future Illinois point guard André Curbelo, Long Island Lutheran was one of the best high school programs in the country. In his junior season, Long Island Lutheran won the New York Class AA state championship. He averaged 18 points and 8.7 rebounds in his senior season. In wins over national powerhouses Sierra Canyon High School and The Patrick School, Key had standout performances, scoring 25 and 37 points, respectively.

Recruiting
Key was rated as a three and four-star recruit and ranked as the fourth best player in New York. On September 22, 2019, Key committed to Ohio State over offers from teams such as Florida, Illinois, and Wisconsin.

College career
Key started his college career off the bench during his freshman year, averaging 5.2 points and 3.4 rebounds per game. He played in all 31 games and totaled 22 blocks, trailing only E. J. Liddell on Ohio State. In a win over Cleveland State, he earned a double-double, scoring 12 points and pulling down 10 rebounds.

In his sophomore season, Key became a consistent starter. He scored a career-high 20 points as an unranked Ohio State upset Duke at home. Overall, he averaged 7.8 points and 5.4 rebounds per game in 23 starts for the Buckeyes.

Career statistics

College

|-
| style="text-align:left;"| 2019–20
| style="text-align:left;"| Ohio State
| 31 || 1 || 11.7 || .616 || .000 || .551 || 3.4 || .3 || .1 || .7 || 5.2

References

External links
Ohio State Buckeyes bio

2002 births
Living people
African-American basketball players
American men's basketball players
Basketball players from New York (state)
Ohio State Buckeyes men's basketball players
People from Bay Shore, New York
Power forwards (basketball)
21st-century African-American sportspeople